Jhon Jairo Culma (born 17 March 1981), sometimes spelled as John Jairo Culma, is a Colombian former footballer who played as a defensive midfielder.

Career
Born in Florida, Valle del Cauca, Culma was raised in Ortigal, Cauca. He began playing youth football in the local Valle del Cauca league, and would train with the youth sides of América de Cali, Millonarios and Deportivo Cali. At age 17, Culma had a trial with Montpellier, but ultimately moved to Argentina where he signed with Independiente.

Culma signed a long-term deal with Cruz Azul in 2001, where he would play primarily for its affiliate club, Cruz Azul Oaxaca. However, he was selected to participate in the parent club's 2003 Copa Libertadores matches.

In 2005, Brujas manager Carlos Restrepo signed Culma to play for the Costa Rican Primera División club.

Culma played for the Colombia national under-20 football team, participating in the 2001 South American U-20 Championship.

Honours
Israeli Premier League: 2008–09, 2010–11

Personal life
Culma's brother, Gustavo, is also a professional footballer who plays for Once Caldas.

References

External links

1981 births
Living people
Association football midfielders
Colombian footballers
Colombia under-20 international footballers
Colombian expatriate footballers
Club Atlético Independiente footballers
Cruz Azul footballers
Brujas FC players
Maccabi Haifa F.C. players
Bnei Sakhnin F.C. players
Stade Brestois 29 players
Argentine Primera División players
Ligue 1 players
Expatriate footballers in Argentina
Expatriate footballers in Mexico
Expatriate footballers in Costa Rica
Expatriate footballers in Israel
Expatriate footballers in France
Colombia international footballers
Sportspeople from Valle del Cauca Department